Hypena taiwana is a moth of the family Erebidae first described by Alfred Ernest Wileman in 1915. It is found in Taiwan.

References

taiwana
Moths described in 1915
Moths of Taiwan